General Said Dheere Mohamed is a Somali military official. Beginning in 2008, he served as Chief of Army under the Transitional Federal Government. Mohamed was replaced with Yusuf Osman Dhumal on 15 May 2009, and subsequently became a security advisor to then President Sheikh Sharif Ahmed.

References

Somalian military leaders
Living people
Somalian generals
Year of birth missing (living people)